Sphaerodactylus roosevelti, also known commonly as Roosevelt's beige sphaero or Roosevelt's least gecko, is a small species of lizard in the family Sphaerodactylidae. The species is endemic to Puerto Rico.

Etymology
The specific name, roosevelti, is in honor of Theodore Roosevelt Jr., who was Governor of Puerto Rico in 1931.

Habitat

Description
All dorsal scales are large, strongly keeled, flattened, and overlapping. There is no middorsal zone of granular scales.

Reproduction
S. roosevelti is oviparous.

References

Further reading
Bauer AM, Russell AP, Shadwick RE (1990). "Skin mechanics and morphology of the gecko Sphaerodactylus roosevelti ". American Zoologist 30 (4): 570.
Grant C (1931). "The sphaerodactyls of Porto Rico, Culebra and Mona islands". Journal of the Department of Agriculture of Puerto Rico 15: 199–213. (Sphaerodactylus roosevelti, new species, p. 203).
Rösler H (2000). "Kommentierte Liste der rezent, subrezent und fossil bekannten Geckotaxa (Reptilia: Gekkonomorpha)". Gekkota 2: 28–153. (Sphaerodactylus roosevelti, p. 114). (in German).
Schwartz A, Henderson RW (1991). Amphibians and Reptiles of the West Indies: Descriptions, Distributions, and Natural History. Gainesville: University of Florida Press. 720 pp. . (Sphaerodactylus roosevelti, p. 528).
Schwartz A, Thomas R (1975). A Check-list of West Indian Amphibians and Reptiles. Carnegie Museum of Natural History Special Publication No. 1. Pittsburgh: Carnegie Museum of Natural History. 216 pp. (Sphaerodactylus roosevelti, pp. 160–161).

Sphaerodactylus
Endemic fauna of Puerto Rico
Reptiles of Puerto Rico
Reptiles described in 1931
Taxa named by Chapman Grant